"Owning the libs" is a political strategy used by some conservatives in the United States that focuses on upsetting political liberals. Users of the strategy emphasize and expand upon culture war issues intended to be divisive to provoke a reaction in others.

Terminology 

Variant phrases such as "triggering the libs" and "melting snowflakes" are also used to refer to the strategy.

The phrase "own the libs" comes from a slang usage of the word own, meaning "to dominate," "to defeat," or, "to humiliate." The phrase was coined and popularized by critics of the strategy, including politician Nikki Haley, who increased the prominence of the phrase in a 2018 speech in which she criticized the strategy as unpersuasive. It is also used by some who practice the strategy, such as Dan Bongino. The phrase dates back to at least 2015.

The "trigger" variants of the phrase come from the idea of trauma triggers and "trigger warnings" intended to avoid them. In his 2019 book Triggered, Donald Trump Jr. says that the purpose of triggering liberals is to oppose political correctness.

The strategy is associated with confrontational political slogans such as "fuck your feelings," and "make liberals cry again."

History 

Conservative student activist groups like Turning Point USA and remixes of campus speakers like Ben Shapiro played a key role in developing the strategy during the 2000s and 2010s. The 2008 vice-presidential campaign of Sarah Palin was a precursor to the owning the libs method, according to former Republican strategist and Lincoln Project co-founder Rick Wilson. Palin marked a merger between politics and entertainment, causing an anxiety among educated elites that her voters found thrilling. Wilson says that owning the libs assuages insecurities of people on the American political right, and has become central to the Republican Party because of its success at this. More recently, the strategy is associated with Donald Trump and Donald Trump Jr.
This method was adopted by the alt-right and alt-lite as a form of trolling and antagonism in the mid/late 2010s.

Goals 

Online troll Jacob Wohl has stated that the goal in owning the libs is to evoke in people "the type of unhinged emotional response that you would expect out of somebody who is suffering a serious mental episode." The strategy uses trolling to attempt to portray political opponents as weak, biased, or overtly emotional, and to portray oneself as superior because of a lack of emotion. Users of the strategy sometimes seek to be deplatformed — for example, to have their own speaking engagements canceled — in order to gain notoriety.

Shared enjoyment of owning the libs maintains group cohesion among a conservative voting bloc, according to Nicole Hemmer of Columbia University. Hemmer views the strategy as substitute for the cohesive conservative ideology that existed during the Cold War.

The phrase "the cruelty is the point" was coined from the title of Adam Serwer's 2018 article in The Atlantic about Trump supporters building community together by delighting in the suffering of those they consider outsiders. The phrase and the observation about shared joy in cruelty have been written about in the media as the purpose of owning the libs.

Rutgers University media scholar Khadijah White says that the strategy serves to excuse corruption from one's political allies by portraying one's opponents as equally corrupt.

Art critic Ben Davis has written that the painter Jon McNaughton's stated goal of creating work that "triggers the left" undersells the sincerity of his work. McNaughton's paintings communicate a "real and popular viewpoint" sincerely held by conservative or reactionary consumers of art, even as the paintings also function as memes intended to upset perceived political enemies.

Criticism

The strategy of owning the libs has been criticized by both liberal and conservative observers as an unsuccessful strategy, or as leading only to counterproductive Pyrrhic victory.

At a 2018 Turning Point USA event, Republican Nikki Haley remarked:

In her book Troll Nation, Amanda Marcotte argues that owning the libs is so central to the political right that any effort to show care and concern for the well-being of others, or even for oneself, is viewed as suspiciously liberal. She gives the example of "rolling coal" — modifying a pickup truck to produce clouds of black smoke. Exhaust from rolling coal is sometimes directed at drivers of fuel-efficient cars and cyclists, in order to offend their presumed liberal environmentalist values. Marcotte argues that rolling coal has no value outside of trolling liberals, yet it costs the coal-roller money, and also increases fuel consumption, can void the warranty, and may violate air-pollution laws. Hence, Marcotte argues, rolling coal is an expensive and counterproductive way to misconstrue environmentalism as an identity marker instead of a policy matter.

In 2020, Paul Waldman wrote that "hatred of liberals is all that's left of conservatism." He argues that owning the libs has pushed aside all policy goals previously central to Republicans, such as small government and lower taxes, and also Republican commitment to democracy and patriotism. Waldman gives the example of the Texas v. Pennsylvania lawsuit and the physical violence threatened against Republicans who refused to join the suit.

See also 
 Schadenfreude

References

Further reading

 
 

Conservatism in the United States
Political terminology of the United States
21st-century social movements